Hudson is a village in McLean County, Illinois, United States. The population was 1,753 at the 2020 census. It is part of the Bloomington–Normal Metropolitan Statistical Area.

Geography
Interstate 39 passes along the western boundary of the village, with access from Exit 5. I-39 leads south  to Normal and north  to El Paso.

History

Origin and naming
Hudson was laid out by Horatio Petit on August 13, 1836. It was one of eight towns founded in McLean County during the great real estate boom that swept through central Illinois between 1835 and 1837. It also shares the distinction of being one of two "colonial" settlements in the county; the other was the Rhode Island colony in the southwestern part of the county. Traditional sources say that the town was named for the town of Hudson in Columbia County, New York, which, so it was said, was the home of its early settlers. However, in her book on the Hudson Colony, Ruth Biting Hamm has pointed out that, while some settlers were from Queens County, New York, none came from near the town of Hudson. She suggests that it is more likely town was simply named for the Hudson River.

The Illinois Land Association
Hudson was created by the Illinois Land Association, who developed it as what was then called a colony. Colonial schemes such as this were popular in the 1830s. Rather than settlers migrating individually and buying land on their own, participants in a colony would band together, pool their money, and appoint a committee to select a large tract of land, which would then be divided among the participants. Such colonial developments do not imply that the group had any common social or religious agenda. Sometimes, the people involved came from a single area, but often, as was the case in Hudson, they were clusters of individuals who had no connection forming the colony: several of the founders of Hudson were from New York, but others were from Maine, Massachusetts, Pennsylvania and Illinois. The Illinois Land Association was formed in February 1836 in Jacksonville. The association also anticipated a profit from the sale of untaken land, which would be shared among the participants. An executive committee selected the land, supervised the laying out of the town, and presided over the drawing of lots to select the division of the property.

Original town design
The 1836 plan of the town of Hudson was interesting in several respects. First, most central Illinois towns of the 1830s were laid around a central public square, but Hudson had none. Second, the town of Hudson had both "in lots" - and "out lots". The "in lots" formed the core of Hudson and were standard blocks of lots like any other town. These were surrounded by a ring of "out lots", which were slightly larger, but still part of the original town plan. At Hudson the "out lots" differ in size. The tradition of in and out lots goes back for centuries in New England, where farmers were reluctant to consign their livestock to locations far removed from the town center. These "out lots" should not be confused with the far larger tracts of farming land that were also assigned to each settler. It is unclear why this out-of-date design should have been adopted at Hudson. The original town contained 30 blocks of "in lots", each of which contained eight lots; because each participant received several lots, the houses in the older part of town even today are often much more widely spaced than in other towns founded at the same date. Eventually the "in lots" and the "out lots" came to be used in much the same way, as residential building sites.

Development
Immediately after its founding Hudson fell on hard times. In 1837 the land market turned sour, settlement slowed, and Illinois sank into a deep depression. The organizers of the colony found that they were unable to purchase the intended  of timber for each settler; earlier settlers had already purchased most of the available woodland. Disputes arose concerning the division of profits from land sales. The number of settlers was fewer than expected. Only about twenty families moved onto the colony's land. They did manage to build a number of substantial frame houses. There was a nearby school and two churches, but the townsfolk had little business. All of this changed in 1854 when the Illinois Central Railroad passed just west of Hudson. Business increased, many unoccupied lots were taken up, and a new commercial district developed along what had been "out-lots" along the west side of the town facing the railroad. Some old traditions continued. Early in its history, Hudson, following an ancient New England custom, had created the office of village herdsman. It was his job, at 6:00 in the morning, to walk the town streets, gather cattle from Hudson, and drive them out to pasture beyond the town limits; remarkably this job continued until 1913.

Growth continues
With the arrival of the railroad, the success of the town of Hudson was assured. The surrounding tallgrass prairie proved to be some of the most fertile agricultural land in the world. Initially the crops were corn and oats, produced together with a great deal of livestock. In the 1850s and 1860s settlers came in great numbers. By the mid-twentieth century livestock production had slowly begun to decline and soybeans had replaced oats as a second crop, but the great fertility of the soil remained. Hudson's growth was slow but steady. In 1873 the town was incorporated. By 1883 telephone service had come to the town, and in 1912 the first electric lights were installed. In 1916 a new town hall was built. In the late twentieth century, because of its proximity to Bloomington and Normal, Hudson was becoming increasingly popular as a residential community. In 1992 Interstate 39 was completed, connecting Hudson with El Paso and Normal.

Demographics

As of the census of 2000, there were 1,510 people, 507 households, and 432 families residing in the village. The racial makeup of the village was 98.48% White, 0.07% African American, 0.13% Native American, 0.46% Asian, 0.40% from other races, and 0.46% from two or more races. Hispanic or Latino of any race were 1.06% of the population.

There were 507 households, out of which 50.7% had children under the age of 18 living with them, 77.9% were married couples living together, 5.5% had a female householder with no husband present, and 14.6% were non-families. 12.4% of all households were made up of individuals, and 4.7% had someone living alone who was 65 years of age or older. The average household size was 2.98 and the average family size was 3.25.

In the village, the population was spread out, with 33.2% under the age of 18, 5.0% from 18 to 24, 37.1% from 25 to 44, 18.5% from 45 to 64, and 6.1% who were 65 years of age or older. The median age was 32 years. For every 100 females, there were 94.1 males. For every 100 females age 18 and over, there were 94.6 males.

The median income for a household in the village was $62,632, and the median income for a family was $65,703. Males had a median income of $45,385 versus $29,659 for females. The per capita income for the village was $22,141. About 1.8% of families and 1.2% of the population were below the poverty line, including 2.0% of those under age 18 and none of those age 65 or over.

Notable people 

 Ben Corbett (1892-1961), film actor known mainly for westerns; born in Hudson
 Elbert Hubbard (1856–1915), known for his essay "A Message of Garcia" and founding the Roycroft community; grew up in Hudson and died in the sinking of the RMS Lusitania
 Melville Elijah Stone (1848–1929), journalist, owner of the Chicago Daily News, general manager of the Associated Press (1893–1918)

See also
 Gildersleeve House
 Hubbard House

References

External links

Villages in McLean County, Illinois
Villages in Illinois
Populated places established in 1836
1836 establishments in Illinois